The 2012–13 Eintracht Frankfurt season was the 113th season in the club's football history. In 2012–13 the club played in the Bundesliga, the top tier of German football. It was the club's first season back in this league and 44th overall, having been promoted from the 2. Bundesliga in 2012. Finishing the domestic season in sixth position, Eintracht qualified for the UEFA Europa League 2013–14.

The club also took part in the 2012–13 edition of the DFB-Pokal, the German Cup, where it was knocked out by 2. Bundesliga side Erzgebirge Aue.

Matches

Legend

Friendlies

Bundesliga

League table

Results by round

Positions by round
The table lists the positions of teams after each week of matches. In order to preserve chronological evolvements, any postponed matches are not included to the round at which they were originally scheduled, but added to the full round they were played immediately afterwards. For example, if a match is scheduled for matchday 13, but then postponed and played between days 16 and 17, it will be added to the standings for day 16.

Matches

DFB-Pokal

Indoor soccer tournament (Frankfurt Cup)

Squad

Squad and statistics

Transfers

Summer transfers in
Stefan Aigner from 1860 Munich
Anderson Bamba from Borussia Mönchengladbach, was previously loaned
Stefano Celozzi from VfB Stuttgart
Ricardo Clark loan return from Stabæk
Vadim Demidov from Real Sociedad
Julian Dudda from Eintracht Frankfurt U19
Alexander Hien from Eintracht Frankfurt U19
Erwin Hoffer loaned from Napoli
Takashi Inui from VfL Bochum
Marc-Oliver Kempf from Eintracht Frankfurt U19
Dorge Kouemaha loaned from Club Brugge
Martin Lanig from 1. FC Köln
Olivier Occéan from Greuther Fürth
Bastian Oczipka from Bayer Leverkusen
Marc Stendera from Eintracht Frankfurt U17
Kevin Trapp from 1. FC Kaiserslautern
Erik Wille from Eintracht Frankfurt U19
Carlos Zambrano from FC St. Pauli

Summer transfers out

Marcos Álvarez to Stuttgarter Kickers
Habib Bellaïd to Sedan
Caio to EC Bahia
Ricardo Clark to Houston Dynamo
Thomas Kessler loan return to 1. FC Köln
Ümit Korkmaz to FC Ingolstadt
Matthias Lehmann to 1. FC Köln
Gordon Schildenfeld to Dynamo Moscow
Dominik Schmidt to Preußen Münster
Marcel Titsch-Rivero to 1. FC Heidenheim
Georgios Tzavelas to Monaco

Winter transfers in 

Srđan Lakić loaned from VfL Wolfsburg
Marco Russ loaned from VfL Wolfsburg

Winter transfers out

Vadim Demidov loaned to Celta Vigo
Rob Friend loaned to 1860 Munich
Erwin Hoffer to 1. FC Kaiserslautern, was on loan from Napoli
Benjamin Köhler to 1. FC Kaiserslautern
Dorge Kouemaha to Gaziantepspor, was on loan from Club Brugge

References

External links
 Official English Eintracht website 
 German archive site
 2012–13 Eintracht Frankfurt season at Weltfussball.de 
 2012–13 Eintracht Frankfurt season at kicker.de 
 2012–13 Eintracht Frankfurt season at Fussballdaten.de 

2012–13
German football clubs 2012–13 season